The Tennessee Volunteers women's volleyball team represents the University of Tennessee located in Knoxville, Tennessee.  The Volunteers (or "Vols") compete in Division I of the National Collegiate Athletics Association (NCAA) and the Southeastern Conference (SEC). The Volunteers play their home matches in the Thompson–Boling Arena on the university's campus, and are currently led by 3rd-year head coach Eve Rackham.

Along with all other UT women's sports teams, it used the nickname "Lady Volunteers" (or the short form "Lady Vols") until the 2015–16 school year, when the school dropped the "Lady" prefix from the nicknames of all women's teams except in basketball. In late 2017 the university reinstated the “Lady Volunteer” nickname for all women’s sports teams.

Program History 
Since the Volunteers have begun competing in the NCAA they have begun a successful trend of winning and have recently built a very sound program that competes for conference championships regularly. The Vols have managed to make the NCAA Volleyball Tournament and AIAW Tournament a total of 23 times and reached the semi-finals in the tournament in 2005. The Lady Vols are generally considered the 3rd best program in the SEC historically, behind Kentucky and Florida, as they have the 3rd most appearances in the NCAA Tournaments, and are tied with LSU for 3rd most conference championships (9).

Rob Patrick Era 
From 1997 until his retirement in 2017, Rob Patrick led the Lady Vols to 9 NCAA Tournaments, 2 SEC Championships, an SEC Tournament, and 11 20+ win seasons. One highlight of the Rob Patrick campaign came in 2004, when the Lady Vols set program records in wins (32), win percentage (.914), and claimed the SEC regular season and tournament championships. This success culminated in a #12 national seed and a NCAA Sweet 16 berth. The Lady Vols finished the 2004 season with a final record of 32-3 (15-1 SEC). The success rolled into 2005 as the Lady Vols made their deepest postseason appearance with their first and only NCAA Final Four appearance. Despite his accomplishments, the Lady Vols struggled during his final two years finishing a combined 29-29 and 12-24 in SEC play by the time Patrick retired in 2017.

Eve Rackham-Watt Era 
On January 10, 2018, former athletic director Phillip Fulmer announced Eve Rackham as the new head coach for the Lady Volunteers. In her first season as head coach, Rackham led the largest single season turnaround in program history, taking a team that finished 12-15 (5-13 SEC) the previous season to 26-6 (16-2 SEC) with a 2nd place SEC finish. Additionally, Rackham ended a 5 year postseason drought in 2018, and guided the Lady Vols to back-to-back NCAA tournaments for the first time since 2012 by qualifying in 2021 and 2022.

Yearly Record 

The University of Tennessee first fielded a women's varsity volleyball team in the fall of 1958 and first kept recordings of games in 1973. Since then, the Volunteers have won four Southeastern Conference (SEC) championships.

All-Americans 

Tennessee has 17 All-Americans including two AVCA All-America first team selections 

Kristen Andre, 2004, 2005
Sarah Blum, 2006
April Chapple, 1984
Leslie Cikra, 2011
Nikki Fowler, 2008, 2009, 2010
Chloe Goldman, 2009
Leah Hinkey, 2010
DeeDee Harrison, 2011
Kayla Jeter, 2010
Julie Knytych, 2004, 2005
Amy Morris, 2004, 2005
Ellen Mullins, 2012
Michelle Piantadosi, 2004
Mary Pollmiller, 2011
Beverly Robinson, 1982
Kelsey Robinson, 2011, 2012
Yuliya Stoyanova, 2005, 2006

See also
List of NCAA Division I women's volleyball programs

References

External links
 

 
1958 establishments in Tennessee
Volleyball clubs established in 1958